VAF may stand for:

 Valence-Chabeuil Airport, a French airport
 Variety Artistes' Federation, a former British trade union
 Vernacular Architecture Forum, an American scholarly organisation
 Volunteer Army Foundation, a New Zealand student movement